Semyon Antonovich Kozak (– 24 December 1953) was a Ukrainian Soviet Army lieutenant general who was twice awarded the title Hero of the Soviet Union for his command of a division during World War II.

Early life 
During the Russian Civil War, from March 1921, he worked as a storekeeper on the Southwestern Railroad. Kozak fought as part of a separate company of the Forces of Special Purpose (ChON) against the nationalist armed bands of Garas and Ditrovsky in Ovruch between May and August 1922. He began a year of studies at the provincial Soviet Party School at Zhitomir in October 1922 and at the end of this period was sent to Olevsk and Barash as a party worker. With a detachment of workers of the district executive committee and the district party committee, Kozak participated in the suppression of the band of Vasilenko near Barash in December 1923.

Drafted into the Red Army on 28 March 1924, Kozak was sent to the howitzer artillery battalion of the 23rd Rifle Division of the Ukrainian Military District in Chuguyev, where he served successively as a Krasnoarmeyets-politruk, head of the party organization, and assistant military commissar of the 3rd battery. After becoming temporary politruk of the battalion school, he passed the examination to complete a course at the Kiev Artillery School in 1928. From January 1929 Kozak served successively as commander of the 5th battery and then the training battery of the artillery regiment of the 51st Rifle Division, and as an instructor at the district commanders' courses at Nikolayev.

World War II 
In World War II, he was Deputy Chief of Staff of the 64th Army (Oct 1942 - April 1943). Later he commanded the 73rd Guards Rifle Division (April 1943 - March 1945) and the 75th and 21st Guards Rifle Corps (March 1945 - April 1947).

Postwar 
After the war, he was commander of the 10th Guards Rifle Corps (1947-1950), Assistant Commander of the Far Eastern Military District (1950-1953) and commanding Officer of the 15th Army.

References

Bibliography 

 

1902 births
1953 deaths
Heroes of the Soviet Union
Soviet military personnel
Frunze Military Academy alumni